Hugo Walser (1 June 1940 – 7 December 2005) was a Liechtenstein middle-distance runner. He competed in the men's 800 metres and 1500 metres at the 1964 Summer Olympics.

Personal bests
 800 metres: 1:55.9 (1962)
 1500 metres: 3:53.3 (1964)

References

1940 births
2005 deaths
Athletes (track and field) at the 1964 Summer Olympics
Liechtenstein male middle-distance runners
Olympic athletes of Liechtenstein
Place of birth missing